Look What Happened to Samson (Spanish:Lo que le pasó a Sansón) is a 1955 Mexican comedy film directed by Gilberto Martínez Solares and starring Germán Valdés, Ana Bertha Lepe and Yolanda Varela.

Main cast
 Germán Valdés as Tin Tan / Sansón  
 Ana Bertha Lepe as Lila / Dalila  
 Yolanda Varela as Soledad / Semadar  
 Andrés Soler as Tío de Lila / Gran Sarán  
 Marcelo Chávez as Arthur / Príncipe Atur  
 Eduardo Alcaraz as Padre de Dalila  
Elvira Quintana as Miriam  
 Manuel Calvo as Matouk  
 María Herrero as Arpagona  
 Óscar Ortiz de Pinedo 
 Armando Arriola as Don Santiago / Arquitecto Pío Rea  
 Elvira Lodi 
 Carlos Bravo y Fernández as Guardia

References

Bibliography 
 Carlos Monsiváis & John Kraniauskas. Mexican Postcards. Verso, 1997.

External links 
 

1955 films
1955 comedy films
Mexican comedy films
1950s Spanish-language films
Films directed by Gilberto Martínez Solares
Mexican black-and-white films
1950s Mexican films